In molecular biology, the snoRNA ACA53 belongs to the H/ACA family of pseudouridylation guide snoRNAs. This H/ACA box RNA was cloned by Kiss et al. (2004) from a HeLa cell extract immunoprecipitated with an anti-GAR1 antibody. It has no identified target RNA. RNA residues targeted for pseudouridylation by this molecule have not been identified.

References

External links 
 
 snoRNAbase entry snoRA53

Small nuclear RNA